Nils Solstad (born 27 July 1963) is a retired Norwegian football defender.

Hailing from Mortensnes in Tromsø, Solstad played youth football for IF Fløya and got one senior match before moving to Tromsø IL in 1981. He made his debut in 1982 and became a stalwart until his retirement after the 1993 season. He helped win the 1986 Norwegian Football Cup.

In 1997 he was player-manager of Porsanger IL. He later coached Tromsø IL's junior team and IF Skarp in two terms, first in the latter half of 2000 together with Trond Johansen, then in 2002 until he resigned in August that year. He returned to Tromsø IL and their scouting program Barents Fotball Academy.

References

1963 births
Living people
Sportspeople from Tromsø
Norwegian footballers
Tromsø IL players
Norwegian First Division players
Eliteserien players
Association football defenders
Norwegian football managers